Hazim Kamaledin (born in Babylon, Iraq in 1954) is a playwright, theatre director, actor, author (novel, short story, translation), and editor, born in Babylon, Iraq. In 2014, The Arab Theatre Institute proclaimed him best playwright of the year.

Life 
Kamaledin studied at the Academy of Fine Arts in Baghdad, Iraq. In the late seventies, Kamaledin fled from Iraq after he had been threatened, arrested and tortured. He also made a satirical play for which he was sentenced to death. He came to Belgium and became artistic leader of two companies: Woestijn ’93 [Desert '93] and Cactusbloem [Cactus Flower]. Kamaledin was a board member of PEN Vlaanderen https://penvlaanderen.be/ from 2016 to 2018. He lives and works in Antwerp, Belgium.

Awards 
 In 2014 he was pronounced Best Theatre Writer of the Year by the Arabic Theatre Institute.
 In 2016 his novel 'Desertified Water' was nominated for the International Prize for Arabic Fiction.

Books (as novelist, translator & playwright) 

Novels:
 1994 Tomb of silence (prose - anthology) published by Woestijn '93, in Arabich 
 2014 Cabaret, in Arabic كاباريهت 
 2016 Desertified Water, in Arabic  
 2016 Schoonheid raast in mij tot ik sterf, in Nederlands Beauty Will Rage Within Me Until the Day I Die | Flanders literature  
 2019 Meadows of Hell, in Arabic 
 2020 The Confusing Episodes of The Lady of The Necrophilia, in Arabic أساليب سردية لابتكار القسوة | محمود الغيطاني

Drama:
 2003 El Addade, in Dutch, published by Woestijn '93 DE SINGEL
 2011 The Tomb of the Lady, four monologues, In Arabic, published by Dar Alghaoon, Lebanon عند مرقد السيدة
 2016 Premeditated Insanity, in Arabic السادرون في الجنون, United Arab Emirates, published by Arab Theater Institute https://www.atitheatre.ae/admin-6443/ حازم كمال الدين

Translations: 
 2019 Theater, Three monologues for an actor, by Jan Fabre, from Dutch into Arabic 
 2020 Poetry, The Armpits of the Goat, by Annemarie Estor, from Dutch into Arabic
 2022 Theatre, The Towers of Beirut, by Paul Verrept, from Dutch to Arabic

أديبة تبحث عن الكمال في الشرق.. من هي "أنماري أستر"؟

Theatre productions (as author & director) 
 1994-1995, Blauw van as KSP - Producties - Blauw van as (1994-1995-podiumproductie)
 1995-1996 Les ombres dans le sable ASP@sia - Les Ombres dans le sable-1994-1995
 1996-1997 Heupen met hersens 
 1997-1998 Gamma van stilte VTI - Theater Texts - Gamma van stilte
 1998-2000 De uren nul VTI - Theater Texts - De uren nul
 1999-2000 Het oog van de dadel Woestijn ''93 brengt psychedelische choreografie met Sheherazade
 1999-2000 Pijnboom VTi - Theater Texts - Pijnboom
 2001-2002 Foto's in de storm 
 2001-2002 De Kop van de Mameluk Djaber 
 2003-2004 Balling KSP - Producties - Balling (2002-2003-podiumproductie)
 2003-2004 El Sherife KSP - Producties - El sherife (2003-2004-podiumproductie)
 2003-2004 El Addade  KSP - Theaterteksten - El Addade
 2004-2005 De tochten 
 2005-2006 Vvredestad  
 2007-2008 Bagdad bazaar 
 2008-2009 Oraal 
 2009-2010 De graftombe van de dame

References

Living people
1954 births
Iraqi writers
Iraqi theatre directors
20th-century Iraqi novelists
Iraqi translators
21st-century Iraqi novelists